Nogometni klub Šmartno 1928, commonly referred to as NK Šmartno or simply Šmartno, is a Slovenian football club from Šmartno ob Paki which competes in the Slovenian Third League, the third highest league in Slovenia. The club emerged after the dissolution of NK Šmartno ob Paki, a team that played in the Slovenian top division for several seasons before being dissolved. However, the new club that was founded in 2005 is legally not a successor of the dissolved club.

Honours
Slovenian Third League
 Winners: 2009–10

Slovenian Fourth Division
 Winners: 2006–07, 2017–18

Slovenian Fifth Division
 Winners: 2005–06

MNZ Celje Cup
 Winners: 2012–13, 2013–14

League history

References

External links
Official website 

Association football clubs established in 2005
Football clubs in Slovenia
2005 establishments in Slovenia